Nexteer Automotive is a global motion control technology company. It is a publicly traded company owned about one-third by its shareholders and about two-thirds by Pacific Century Motors, which in turn is 51% owned by AVIC Automotive. Nexteer's global headquarters is in Auburn Hills, Michigan, United States.  

Nexteer is an automotive supplier delivering electric and hydraulic power steering systems, steer-by-wire systems, steering columns and intermediate shafts, driveline systems and software for original equipment manufacturers (OEMs). The company has 26 manufacturing plants, four technical and software centers, and 13 customer service centers located in North and South America, Europe, Asia and Africa. The company serves more than 60 customers in every major region of the world including BMW, Changan, Dongfeng  Peugeot  Citroën  Automobile, Ford, General  Motors, Maruti Suzuki India, Renault-Nissan Mitsubishi Alliance  (RNM), SAIC General Motors, SAIC-GM-Wuling Automobile (SGMW), Stellantis (formerly Fiat Chrysler Automobiles and Groupe PSA), Toyota and Volkswagen as well as domestic automakers in India, China and South America.

History
Nexteer's original predecessor was founded in 1906 in Saginaw, Michigan, USA under the name Jackson, Wilcox and Church. Their product was named the Jacox gear. In 1909, the unit was purchased by Buick and then was transferred to parent company General Motors as the Jackson, Church and Wilcox Division. The division was renamed Saginaw Product Company in 1919 and Saginaw Steering Gear Division in 1928. The trade name of Jacox was changed to Saginaw in 1930. Saginaw Steering for 90 years was a part of GM. Saginaw Division became the division's name in 1985. The Saginaw Division is grouped with other GM component units into Automotive Components Group. GM in 1999 spun off its parts group as Delphi Automotive including Saginaw Steering. Saginaw Division was renamed Delphi Steering.

Nexteer
With Delphi entering a lengthy bankruptcy proceeding, GM purchased Delphi Steering through their subsidiary, GM Global Steering Holdings LLC, in 2009 and renamed the company, Nexteer Automotive. GM moved to have the union change their contract with Nexteer in order to prepare the company for a sale as Nexteer had multiple customers besides GM.  After the first offered agreement, GM warned the employees that this may hamper finding a buyer; the results being that GM may just shut Nexteer down. A second agreement was ratified by the union. The Michigan Economic Growth Authority gave a $70.7 million state tax credit over ten years to Nexteer in November 2009. Nexteer announced that same month investment plans totaling $400 million across the board and keeping its headquarters in Buena Vista Township.  The Township responded with a 100 percent 20 year tax abatement. Nexteer was acquired by Pacific Century Motors on November 29, 2010. After the purchase, Nexteer was split into two separate companies.

Nexteer originally was going to go public on the Hong Kong Stock Exchange in June 2013, but the IPO was delayed until October 2013.

The company relocated its headquarters to Auburn Hills, Michigan in 2015.

Technology

History 
1906: 	Manual Steering 
1951: 	Hydraulic Assisted Steering 
1960s: 	 Tilt-Wheel Steering Columns, Front-Wheel Drive Halfshafts, Energy-Absorbing Column
1970s: 	 Air Bag Column, First Rack and Pinion Gear
1980s: 	 Global Engineering
1995: 	Speed Variable Assist, Electric Power Steering 
1999: 	Power Tilt Telescope Column, Quadrasteer 
2004: 	Active Energy-Absorbing Column, Tri-Glide Halfshaft Joint 
2009:	Single Pinion Electric Power Steering
2010: 	 World’s first 12-Volt Electric Power Steering Systems 
2011: 	 Full Size Truck Rack Electric Power Steering and CrossGlide Joint
2013: 	 Magnetic Torque Overlay 
2017: 	 CNXMotion, a joint venture between Nexteer & Continental 
2018: 	 Advanced Steering Technology Suite, including Steer-by-Wire

Products 
 Steering Systems: active steering, electric power steering, hydraulic power steering and torque overlay
 Electric Power Steering: Since 1999, Nexteer Automotive has put more than 70 million EPS units on the road.
 Steering Components: columns; electronics, modules & sub-assemblies; intermediate shafts.
 Driveline Products: front-wheel drive halfshafts, rear-wheel drive halfshafts, intermediate drive shafts, propeller shaft joints, advanced technology.
Assisted & Automated Driving Enablers

References 

Auto parts suppliers of the United States
Manufacturing companies based in Michigan
Saginaw, Michigan
Vehicle manufacturing companies established in 2009
2009 establishments in Michigan
Companies listed on the Hong Kong Stock Exchange
2010 mergers and acquisitions
Former General Motors subsidiaries